Virginia's 4th House of Delegates district is one of 100 seats in the Virginia House of Delegates, the lower house of the state's bicameral legislature. District 4 covers all of Dickenson County and portions of Russell County, Washington County, and Wise County, Virginia. The district is represented by Republican Delegate Will Wampler

District officeholders

Electoral history

External links
 

004
Dickenson County, Virginia
Russell County, Virginia
Washington County, Virginia
Wise County, Virginia